The Ground (released 31 January 2005 in Germany on the label ECM [ECM 1892]) is an album by Norwegian jazz pianist and composer Tord Gustavsen, recorded in 2004.

Reception
"Melancholia is marvellous – and quiet," stated The Guardian reviewer Stuart Nicholson, who awarded the album 5 stars. The Allmusic review by Michael G. Nastos awarded the album 3½ stars, stating:

Track listing
"Tears Transforming" (5:38)
"Being There" (4:17)
"Twins" (4:57)
"Curtains Aside" (5:15)
"Colours of Mercy" (6:09)
"Sentiment" (5:35)
"Kneeling Down" (5:48)
"Reach Out and Touch It" (5:48)
"Edges of Happiness" (3:07)
"Interlude" (2:03)
"Token of Tango" (4:12)
"The Ground" (7:16)

Personnel
Tord Gustavsen – piano
Harald Johnsen – bass
Jarle Vespestad – drums

Credits 
All compositions by Tord Gustavsen
Cover design by Sascha Kleis
Engineered by Jan Erik Kongshaug
Liner photos by Chris Tribble
Produced by Manfred Eicher

References

ECM Records albums
Tord Gustavsen albums
2005 albums
Albums produced by Manfred Eicher